Mōri Terumoto (毛利 輝元, January 22, 1553 – June 2, 1625) was a Japanese daimyō. The son of Mōri Takamoto, and grandson and successor of the great warlord Mōri Motonari, he fought against Oda Nobunaga but was eventually overcome. He participated in Toyotomi Hideyoshi's Korean Campaign (1592) and built Hiroshima Castle, thus essentially founding Hiroshima.

Early life and rise
Môri Terumoto was born 'Kotsumaru' in 1553. However, in 1563, his father, Mori Takamoto, suddenly died, Kotsumaru was selected as his heir.

In 1564 at what appears to have been an early manhood ceremony, Kotsumaru took the name Terumoto (Teru coming from the shogun, Ashikaga Yoshiteru) and assumed command. 

In 1566, the Môri's traditional rival, the Amago clan, had been destroyed, and Motonari had left instructions that the clan be content with what it had and forego expansionist adventure. To a greater or lesser extent, Terumoto followed his late grandfather's instructions. Aside from skirmishes on Kyushu and gradual penetration further east. The first years of Terumoto's rule passed quietly. 

Later in 1570, Mōri Terumoto along with Mori 'Two Rivers' defeated Amago Katsuhisa at Battle of Fubeyama or Battle of Nunobeyama, and forced Amago Katsuhisa fled to the island of Oki. 

When Motonari died in 1571, Terumoto inherited an enormous kingdom that stretched from Buzen on Kyushu to the borders of Harima and Bizen, a powerful navy (at the time Japan's finest), and the support of two gifted uncles Kobayakawa Takakage and Kikkawa Motoharu.

Conflict with Nobunaga
Before death, Mori Motonari had declared himself no friend to Nobunaga, and the young Terumoto openly challenged Nobunaga. It happened that the Môri were to be drawn into war over the Ishiyama Hongan-ji War, a religious stronghold in Settsu, Nobunaga had been besieging since 1570. 

Terumoto turned to the vaunted Môri navy. In 1576, First Battle of Kizugawaguchi Nobunaga's 'admiral', Kuki Yoshitaka, had cut the Honganji's sea-lanes and sat in blockade off the coast. Terumoto ordered his fleet, commanded by Murakami Takeyoshi, to make for the waters off Settsu and, once there, the navy inflicted an embarrassing defeat on Kuki and opened the Honganji's supply lines.

In 1577, Hideyoshi captured Kozuki Castle in Harima and gave it to Amago Katsuhisa, who, supported by the famed Yamanaka Shikanosuke, hoped to restore the defunct Amago clan to power in Izumo. Perhaps goaded by the mere name of the new defender of Kozuki as much as anything else. In 1578, Terumoto sent his uncles to laid Siege of Kōzuki Castle. This they did, and both Katsuhisa and Shikanosuke were killed. 

Later in 1578, Second Battle of Kizugawaguchi, Kûki Yoshitaka defeat Takeyoshi and drove the Môri away. A further attempt by the Môri to break the blockade the following year was turned back, and in 1580 the Honganji surrendered.

After Hongan-ji surrender, this allowed Nobunaga to concentrate on the Môri and he sent two sizable contingents westward into the Chugoku region. Hashiba Hideyoshi was to march along the southern portion of the arm (the Sanyodo) while Akechi Mitsuhide moved into the upper provinces (the Sanindo).

By 1582 a Môri defeat seemed inevitable. Hideyoshi had forced his way into Bitchu province and laid siege to Takamatsu Castle. Shimizu Muneharu (a former Mimura retainer) defended Takamatsu stoutly, but its loss would all but open the way into Bingo and Aki, the Môri homeland. Hideyoshi knew that Takamatsu would be a tough nut to crack and that heavy losses would only benefit the Môri, so he resorted to a stratagem. Diverting the waters of a nearby river, he flooded the castle grounds, making Takamatsu a soggy island. By now Terumoto had brought up a relief force, but hesitated to attack Hideyoshi directly. Shimizu, for his part, responded to an offer by Hideyoshi that would spare the lives of his men, and committed suicide after ordering his men to surrender.

Service Under Hideyoshi
After the death of Nobunaga at Honnoji Incident in 1582, Probably most relieved at Hideyoshi's evident generosity, Terumoto agreed, to make peace and allowing Hideyoshi to speed home and defeat Akechi Mitsuhide before anyone else was the wiser for it. As frustrated as the Môri may have been by their discovery of the truth, they did not break the truce, and in time became Hideyoshi's closest supporters. 

In 1583 he became a vassal of Toyotomi Hideyoshi. Terumoto sent the 'Two Rivers' (Kobayakawa and Kikkawa) to lead troops for Hideyoshi in his Invasion of Shikoku (1585) and Kyushu Campaign (1587). He sent ships to assist Hideyoshi in his reduction of the Hojo at Siege of Odawara (1590). 

When Hideyoshi invaded Korea in 1592, Terumoto himself led the "7th Division" with 30,000 troops there, although much of his time seems to have been taken up fighting Korean partisans.

Sekigahara Campaign
Terumoto was a member of the council of Five Elders appointed by Hideyoshi.  At the height of his power in late 16th century, Terumoto controlled 1.2 million koku.  This means he could mobilize more than 40,000 men to a battle. He sided to fight against Tokugawa Ieyasu as the "General Commander", but was not present at the Battle of Sekigahara, so the leadership on the battlefield fell to Ishida Mitsunari, one of Hideyoshi's Go-Bugyo. Terumoto was at Osaka Castle defending Toyotomi Hideyori at the time and later surrendered to Ieyasu soon after Mitsunari defeat at Sekigahara. Ieyasu reduced Terumoto's domains, leaving him only Nagato and Suō Provinces, worth 369,000 koku in total.

Death
Finally, his behavior caused resentment among some of his vassals, which led him to retire. 
He was succeeded by Mōri Hidenari. Terumoto died in June 2, 1625 (aged 72) at Yoshida, Aki Province.

He was known as a great patron of Hagi ware pottery.

Family
 Father: Mōri Takamoto (毛利隆元, 1523–1563)
 Mother: Ozaki no Tsubone (尾崎局, 1527–1572), daughter of Naitō Okimori (内藤興盛).
 Main Wife: Seikōin (清光院, 1558–1631), daughter of Shishido Takaie (宍戸隆家).
 Concubine: Seitaiin (清泰院, 1572–1604)
 First Son: Mōri Hidenari (毛利秀就, 1595–1651)
 First Daughter: Takehima (竹姫, 1600–1644), wife of Kikkawa Hiromasa (吉川広正).
 Second Son: Mōri Naritaka (毛利就隆, 1602–1679)
 Concubine: Omatsu (於松, ?–1641), fourth daughter of Hane Yamashiro-no-kami Motoyasu (羽根山城守元泰).
 Concubine: Osen (於千, 1550–1658), daughter of Inoue Kawachi-no-kami Narimasa (井上河内守就正).
 Concubine: Otsu (於鶴, ?–1677), daughter of Hanafusa Tarozaemon Yasuyuki (花房太郎左衛門尉某).
 Concubine: Osana (於さな, ?–1644), daughter of Kodama Kozaemon Noritomo (児玉小左衛門真友).
 Adopted Children:
 Daughter: Komahime (古満姫, ?–1651), second daughter of Shishido Motohide (宍戸元秀). Wife of Kobayakawa Hideaki (小早川秀秋).
 Son: Mōri Hidemoto (毛利秀元, 1579–1650), first son of Mōri Motokiyo (毛利元清) who was fourth son of the famous Mōri Motonari.

It is also said that Terumoto had a concubine who acted as an assassin.

Mōri's "Two Rivers"
Kikkawa Motoharu (吉川 元春, 1530 – December 25, 1586) was the second son of Mōri Motonari. He became head of the Kikkawa clan family around 1550, featured prominently in all the wars of the Mōri clan.

Kobayakawa Takakage (小早川 隆景, 1533 – July 26, 1597) was the third son of Mōri Motonari who was adopted by the Kobayakawa clan and became its 14th clan head, and fought for the Mōri clan in all their campaigns

Mōri Terumoto's "Goyonin"
Four senior vassals who supported Terumoto'
 Kikkawa Motoharu
 Kobayakawa Takakage
 Kuchiba Michiyoshi
 Fukubara Sadatoshi

References

Further reading

1553 births
1625 deaths
Mōri clan
Daimyo
People of the Japanese invasions of Korea (1592–1598)
People from Aki Province
Tairō
Toyotomi retainers
Deified Japanese people